The 49th District of the Iowa House of Representatives in the state of Iowa.

Current elected officials
Dave Deyoe is the representative currently representing the district.

Past representatives
The district has previously been represented by:
 Mike Blouin, 1971–1973
 Albert H. Fullerton, 1973–1976
 Donald H. Binneboese, 1976–1983
 Kathleen Halloran Chapman, 1983–1993
 Robert Dvorsky, 1993–1994
 Richard E. Myers, 1994–2003
 Helen Miller, 2003–2013
 Dave Deyoe, 2013–present

References

049